The Eric Clapton World Tour 2019 is a concert tour by British rock and blues guitarist and singer Eric Clapton, which started on 13 April 2019 through 20 April 2019 at the Nippon Budokan in Tokyo. As of 22 April 2019, a total of seventeen live performances in Japan, in the United Kingdom, Austria, Germany and in the United States were announced. The concert tour ended on 21 September 2019 in Dallas, United States.

Background 
In September 2018, Clapton went to see a concert, held by the German cellist Jan Vogler, who is also the head of artist relations of the Dresden Music Festival. After the show, the two talked about how to keep their hands and fingers in shape during concert tours, according to the Sächsische Zeitung. During the conversation, Vogler invited Clapton to stage an intimate concert at the renovated Kulturpalast in Dresden, which has a capacity of only 1,754 seats. Clapton agreed to close the music festival in June 2019. Due to high ticket demand, the concert was moved to the Messe, which holds 4,000 people. Minutes after the pre-sale began, the concert was sold-out.

On 28 September 2018, it was announced that Clapton would play two additional shows in Germany, including Berlin (Mercedes-Benz-Arena) and Mannheim (SAP Arena) as well as one additional concert in Austria at the Stadthalle in Vienna. On 24 October 2018, Clapton revealed that he will would return to the Royal Albert Hall, London for a series of concerts, which will be his only performances in the United Kingdom in 2019. On 18 January 2019, it was announced that Clapton would take up a five-night residency at Tokyo's Nippon Budokan in April. On 28 March 2019, Clapton announced the Crossroads Guitar Festival 2019 as being part of his tour.

On 22 April 2019, Clapton's management announced that the guitarist will play three live shows in the United States ahead of the fifth Crossroads Guitar Festival in California (Chase Center), Nevada (T-Mobile Arena) and Arizona (Talking Stick Resort Arena) from 11 September 2019 through 14 September 2019. CHASE partnered with Clapton for the concert on 11 September 2019, holding an exclusive presale for cardholders. During his shows at the Royal Albert Hall, Clapton decided to pay tribute to Prince, Bob Dylan and Doris Day, covering their songs "Purple Rain", "Alberta" and "Que Sera, Sera".

Setlist 
This setlist represents the average setlist of the tour. It does not represent all individual shows throughout the tour.

 "Pretending"
 "Key to the Highway"
 "Hoochie Coochie Man"
 "I Shot the Sheriff"
 "Driftin' Blues"*
 "Nobody Knows You When You're Down and Out"*
 "Tears in Heaven"*
 "Running On Faith"*
 "Layla"*
 "Tearing Us Apart"
 "Badge"
 "Holy Mother"
 "Cross Road Blues"
 "Little Queen of Spades"
 "Cocaine"

Encore

 "High Time We Went"

* Indicates that the song was played in an acoustic/unplugged arrangement.

Equipment 

For his 2019 Tokyo residency at the Nippon Budokan, Clapton debuted a new color for his Fender signature model Eric Clapton Stratocaster electric guitar. The color, which is called "Almond Green", was frequently used by British car manufacturer Aston Martin throughout the 2000s and 2010s. The Eric Clapton fan club magazine Where's Eric! noted, that the guitar has model "a much lighter hue than his Strats finished with Porsche and Mercedes car colors". Clapton owned an Aston Martin automobile in the 2000s. During his stint at the Royal Albert Hall in London, Clapton used a Pewter Grey Fender Eric Clapton Stratocaster.

For his unplugged set, Clapton continued to use his signature model OOO-28EC acoustic guitar from Martin Guitars, he played on stage since 2015. However, Where's Eric! noted, that Clapton now uses a small DPA microphone mounted to the pick guard of his close to the bridge of his guitar. For his London shows at the Royal Albert Hall, Clapton was spotted using a Fender '57 tweed Bandmaster reissue model electric guitar amplifier, which is the same model he has used since 2013. Behind the microphoned Bandmaster he kept a spare one (possibly another Bandmaster or maybe a '57 Twin tweed or a Twinolux) as a back-up amplifier. As part of his effects system, the guitarist used a leslie simulator and a distortion effect.

Personnel 
The following musicians were part of Clapton's touring band or appeared as special guests.

 Eric Clapton – Guitar, Vocals
 Chris Stainton – Keyboards
 Nathan East – Bass guitar, Background vocals
 Doyle Bramhall II – Rhythm guitar, Background vocals
 Sonny Emory – Drums, Percussion instruments
 Steve Gadd – Drums (11 September 2019)
 Paul Carrack – Keyboards, Background vocals

 Sharon White – Background vocals
 Katie Kissoon – Background vocals
 John Mayer – Guitar, Background vocals (13 April 2019)
 Jimmie Vaughan – Guitar, Background vocals (15, 16 May 2019)
 Kurt Rosenwinkel – Guitar (4 June 2019)
 Jan Vogler – Cello (10 June 2019)

Tour dates 

Notes

References 

2019 concert tours
Eric Clapton